Nicholas Daniel Coleman (April 22, 1800 – May 11, 1874) was a U.S. Representative from Kentucky.

Born in Cynthiana, Kentucky, Coleman attended the grammar and high schools.
He was graduated from Transylvania College, Lexington, Kentucky.
He studied law.
He was admitted to the bar and practiced.
He served as member of the State house of representatives in 1824 and 1825.

Coleman was elected as a Jacksonian to the Twenty-first Congress (March 4, 1829 – March 3, 1831).
He moved to Vicksburg, Mississippi, where he resumed the practice of law.
Postmaster of Vicksburg 1841–44.
He again resumed the practice of law.
He died in Vicksburg, Mississippi.
He was interred in Cedar Hill Cemetery.

References

1800 births
1874 deaths
Members of the Kentucky House of Representatives
Jacksonian members of the United States House of Representatives from Kentucky
Politicians from Vicksburg, Mississippi
Transylvania University alumni
19th-century American politicians